Ockels may refer to:

Marjet Ockels (1943–2016), Dutch politician
Wubbo Ockels (1946–2014), Dutch physicist
9496 Ockels, asteroid